Sir Nicholas John Gorrod Blake (born 21 June 1949), styled The Hon. Mr Justice Blake, is a retired judge of the High Court of England and Wales.

He was educated at Cranleigh School and Magdalene College, Cambridge.

He was called to the bar at Middle Temple in 1974 and became a bencher there in 2002. He was made a QC in 1994, specialising in immigration, asylum and free movement and human rights law. He was a founding member of Matrix Chambers and first chair of its management committee. He was appointed as a special advocate and as a Deputy High Court judge in 2002, and judge of the High Court of Justice (Queen's Bench Division) since 2007.  From 2004 to 2013 he was a Trustee of the National Portrait Gallery.

From 2010 to 2013 he was President of the newly established Upper Tribunal (Immigration and Asylum Chamber). He served as a British representative of the International Association of Judges.

Blake retired from the bench on 3 October 2017.

References

1949 births
Living people
People educated at Cranleigh School
Alumni of Magdalene College, Cambridge
Members of the Middle Temple
20th-century King's Counsel
Queen's Bench Division judges
Knights Bachelor